EMI may refer to:

Arts and entertainment 
 Escape from Monkey Island, a computer game
 EMI (film), a 2008 Bollywood film
 EMI Films, a British film production and distribution company
 EMI, a music and electronics group of companies
 EMI Music Publishing
 EMI Records, a record label
 "E.M.I." (song), a song from the 1977 Sex Pistols album Never Mind the Bollocks, Here's the Sex Pistols

Education 

 English-medium education, also known as English as a Medium of Instruction
 EMI schools, a category for local secondary schools that uses English as a Medium of Instruction in Hong Kong
 Extended matching items, a type of examination method

Finance 

 Electronic Money Institution, an undertaking that has been authorised to issue e-money
 Equated monthly installment
 European Monetary Institute, a financial institution

Science and technology 

 EMI (protocol), a short message service center protocol
 EMI domain, a protein domain
 Electromagnetic induction
 Electromagnetic interference

Computing 
 European Middleware Initiative
 Experiments in Musical Intelligence, a computer program for generating musical scores
 External Memory Interface

Other uses 

 Emi, a common feminine Japanese given name and surname
 EMI (cycling team), a defunct Italian professional cycling team
 Emergency Management Institute, of the United States Federal Emergency Management Agency
 Emirau Airport in Papua New Guinea
 Enterprise manufacturing intelligence
 Mohammadia School of Engineering, in Rabat, Morocco